Cullompton Community College is a coeducational foundation secondary school located in Cullompton in the county of Devon.

First established in 1872, the school relocated to its current site in 1964, and became fully comprehensive in 1979. In December 2003 it secured sponsorship of £50,000 from The Co-operative Group to enable it to become a Business and Enterprise College. As a foundation school, Cullompton Community College is administered by Devon County Council, which coordinates the schools admissions.

Cullompton Community College offers GCSEs and OCR Nationals as programmes of study for pupils, as well as vocational learning in Animal Care and Land based Learning, Hair and Beauty, Motor Vehicle and Construction.

References

External links
Cullompton Community College official website

Educational institutions established in 1872
1872 establishments in England
Secondary schools in Devon
Foundation schools in Devon
Cullompton